"Smokin'" Joe McAndrew (born 27 August 1958) is one of New Zealand's most successful rally drivers with a record three national championship titles, won in 1993, 1994 and 1996. He also won the 2002 World TWE Marathon, and has over 25 national event wins to his name.

He resides in Wellington with his wife Andrea, who also assists and co-ordinates his rally team. They have two children, Lauren (born 1994) and Sean (born 2002).

External links
smokinjoe.co.nz – Official site
Profile of McAndrew at Rallybase.nl, including international results

1958 births
New Zealand rally drivers
Living people